Charles Clement Walker  (25 August 1877 – 30 September 1968) was a British engineer and aerodynamicist, who became a founding director and chief engineer at de Havilland. He was "one of the great men of aviation's formative decades".

Personal life
He was educated at Highgate School from 1887 to 1892 and went on to University College, London, where he was in 1938 elected a Fellow.

He married Eileen Hood (1892 – 20 May 1970) on 2 September 1916 at St Michael's Church in Highgate, Middlesex.

Their only son David was killed flying on a training aircraft with the 2FTS of the RAF, on 2 October 1941, aged 21.

He lived at his house Foresters in Middlesex. He died aged 91 at home.

His name is commemorated in Walker Grove, a street in Hatfield, Hertfordshire.

See also
de Havilland Mosquito

References

1877 births
1968 deaths
Aerodynamicists
Academics of University College London
Alumni of University College London
Commanders of the Order of the British Empire
Fellows of the Royal Aeronautical Society
De Havilland
De Havilland Mosquito
English civil engineers
People educated at Highgate School
Royal Aeronautical Society Silver Medal winners